The 1934 24 Hours of Le Mans was the 12th Grand Prix of Endurance. It took place at the Circuit de la Sarthe on 16 and 17 June 1934. Four privateer Alfa Romeo entries were expected to fight for outright honours, with an outside chance for the four Bugattis ranged against them. British cars dominated the smaller classes.
Two-time winner Raymond Sommer soon took the lead until, after only 90 minutes, he stopped out on the circuit with smoke pouring from his engine. For the next five hours the Alfas of Luigi Chinetti and Earl Howe duelled for the lead. However, soon after night fell, the lights failed on Howe's Alfa costing him two hours to get the electrics repaired. Chinetti took the lead, but their car had developed a leak in the fuel tank. The solution was the same as Sommer had used the previous year: to plug the gap with chewing-gum.

By the halfway point, there was only a single competitive big-engine car left running, and interest shifted to the race for the Index of Performance between the four British firms of Aston Martin, MG, Riley and Singer. For a time, with race attrition, the 1.1-litre MG of John Ford was running second overall, until a three-car pile-up at Maison Blanche took it out of the race. The Aston Martin challenge collapsed in a disastrous two laps that saw three of their works cars retire. This left the Riley works team to finish second, third, fifth and sixth and claim both the Index of Performance and Biennial Cup.

Regulations and Organisation
The renovation of the circuit and facilities by the Automobile Club de l'Ouest (ACO) were completed. A completely new pit complex was built. Made of concrete with capacity for 60 cars, it was separated from the pit lane and racing track by a wooden picket fence. Pit counters were provided with a second storey for trade stands and guests. Eco and Jupiter, the French distributors of Esso and Shell fuel respectively, pay for each pit-box to be installed with a 1000-litre tank, gantry and hoses to allow refuelling direct to the cars. This was regulated to be at 120 litres/minute.
Race control was also housed in the new pit complex, and a large restaurant opened beside the main grandstand. All the spectator areas now had access to drinking water, and had an earthen bank and fencing put between them and the circuit. Additionally, a 25-hectare golf-course built inside the circuit. Reflecting the greater commercialism of the event, the two main camping areas were regulated and numbered to allow charging spectators who wanted to camp overnight. Regarding the track itself, the straights between the Mulsanne and Arnage were resurfaced and trees along the roadside were felled.

In the years of alternating fuel suppliers, this year Esso had four fuel choices: its regular fuel, a premium grade, 100% benzole and a 70/15/15 blend of the regular with benzole and ethanol. With the new fuel rigs, the ACO allowed a second mechanic to work on a car in the pits, nominated solely as the refueller. 
The minimum running distance between refuelling stops remained at 24 laps. The ACO made significant increases to the class distance-targets, this time in the mid-range engines, with an extra 125 km added to the minimum distance for 3-litre cars for example. Three 8-hour practice sessions were scheduled on the Wednesday, Thursday and Friday nights between 10pm and 6am. Public traffic was also allowed onto the roads at the same time, but this year was only allowed to travel in the same direction as the racing cars.

Entries
Whether due to the ongoing economic recovery, the improved facilities or the thrilling 10-second margin of victory the previous year by superstar Tazio Nuvolari, the race received the largest number of entrants for ten years. Out of the 52 applicants, 45 arrived on race-week for scrutineering with works entries received from the British Aston Martin, Riley and Singer companies and the small French manufacturer Tracta. Although British cars made up almost half the field, none were likely outright race winners. Those would probably come from the privateer Alfa Romeos or Bugattis.

From the thirteen finishers in the previous year’s race, twelve returned to contest the Biennial Cup, which therefore shaped up to be a significant competition.
As grid-order and Index distance were based on engine size (unmodified for supercharging, for the grid position), and there were no prizes for class victory, the nominal class groupings were largely irrelevant.

Note: The first number is the number of entries, the second the number who started. Using the equivalent engine-size with supercharged engines having the x1.4 conversion factor

Over 2-litre entries

For the past three years, Alfa Romeo had dominated Le Mans. The works team had been closed down, with the customer team Scuderia Ferrari representing the marque in Grand Prix racing across Europe. However, in sports-car racing, the team only competed in Italy. Eight private entrants were pit forward although only half of them arrived.
Both Raymond Sommer and Luigi Chinetti (winners together in 1932 and 1st and 2nd respectively in 1933) were back to contest the Biennial Cup. Sommer was aiming to equal Woolf Barnato's record winning three Le Mans in a row. He would be driving an Alfa Romeo with a Grand Prix Monza chassis owned by wealthy Parisian doctor Pierre Félix (bought through Chinetti's Alfa Romeo dealership), modified to accommodate the mandatory two rear seats. The Monza engine gave 180 bhp, an extra 25-30 bhp over the other Alfa entries. Félix had a second entry that did not eventuate. Chinetti had a corto (short-wheelbase) Mille Miglia chassis and brought in French Grand Prix racer Philippe Étancelin as his co-driver. Englishman Earl Howe had won the race in 1931 but had been unable to compete in 1933 because of an eye injury. He returned this year with his 8C-2300 Le Mans, with its 4-seater lungo (long) touring body and with former Talbot stalwart Tim Rose-Richards as his co-driver. Rose-Richards had also filed his own entry for another 8C-2300 Le Mans, driven by Owen Saunders-Davies and Freddie Clifford.

There were five big Bugattis entered this year. Racing journalist Roger Labric got a degree of works support, with two mechanics from Molsheim and driver Pierre Veyron. His was the biggest Bugatti – the supercharged 5-litre Type 50 run by the late Guy Bouriat and Albert Divo in 1931. There were three Type 55 cars entered, with their 2.3-litre supercharged engines. That of the Équipe Braillard did not arrive, while the others were of privateers Charles Brunet and Victor Bayard.
There was also a privately-entered 3-litre Type 44, a popular touring model but only capable of 80 bhp. It was not expected to be among the front-runners, even among the smaller British sports cars, but it would be reliable with an engine not over-stressed.

One again, Prince Nicholas of Romania had the biggest car in the field, with his elegant Duesenberg Model SJ. Its supercharged 6.9-litre twin-cam engine put out 320 bhp with a top speed of 215 kp/h (135 mph). This year he was partnered by Whitney Straight, the Anglo-American with his own grand prix racing team. Labric’s 8-year old Lorraine-Dietrich was now owned by Daniel Porthault, who entered with Just-Émile Vernet, using Vernet’s tenth place finish in a Salmson last year, to take the entry to the Biennial Cup.

1- to 2-litre entries

British cars dominated the medium-sized categories. There were six Rileys entered, including a squad of four works cars. Following on from its successful Brooklands Six racer of the start of the decade, two new designs were unveiled in 1934. The MPH had a 1458cc straight-six engine that now put out 70 bhp, while the Riley Nine Imp, was a short-wheelbase, low-slung version of the Riley Nine, with its 50 bhp 1087cc 4-cylinder engine. For their racing debuts, five cars were brought to Le Mans. Two of the MPHs were entered, for Freddie Dixon / Cyril Paul and Frenchmen Jean Sébilleau / Georges Delaroche. There were also three Imps, including a private effort sponsored by Dorothy Champney (who would soon marry managing director Victor Riley), who had Kay Petre as her co-driver. Those five cars all had the new Wilson pre-selector gearbox.
The works team also entered their last, unsold, Brooklands Nine taking the Biennial Cup spot. It was the one raced the previous year by Sébilleau / Delaroche and given to Ken Peacock and Bill van der Becke, who had earned the entry in that race finishing fourth.

This was the first race for the new Aston Martin design, the Mark 2 Le Mans, from Technical Director ”Bert” Bertelli. The 1.5-litre engine was developed from their racing experience and in the special lightened frame, could get the cars up to 175 kp/h (110 mph). The works team was managed by former Le Mans winner Sammy Davis, with three cars, led by Bertelli himself. There were also two private entries.

The MG K3 had proven to be a giant-killer in British handicap races and on the continent, including consecutive Tourist Trophy victories by Tazio Nuvolari. It was a lightened, short-wheelbase, variant of the K-series and with a Roots supercharger, the 1087cc engine could put out 115 bhp. John Ludovic Ford and Roy Eccles both brought new cars to Le Mans, however Eccles ran his one unsupercharged to get a shorter distance in the Index competition.
After just a single entry last year, Singer put in a concerted effort this year. The Singer Nine Le Mans came with two engine options. The 1493cc version put out 63 bhp and was fitted with Singer’s constant-mesh gearbox. On the Hunaudières Straight, it could get up to 170 kp/h (105 mph). The company supported two customer teams, both eligible for the Biennial Cup. Stanley Barnes had raced the Singer last year. Arthur Fox had run Lagondas and Talbots at Le Mans for five years. Still awaiting the new Lagonda, he had a Biennial entry from finishing third in 1933 with an Alfa Romeo. His drivers were Brian Lewis, Baron Essendon (fresh from winning the Mannin Moar on the Isle of Man) and Johnny Hindmarsh.

Automobiles Derby was a Paris-based British company, taken over by former Bentley works driver Douglas Hawkes. He worked with renowned female motorcyclist and racer, Gwenda Stewart to develop a new four-wheel drive models. After the L2, came the L8 with a new 2-litre V8 engine that could develop 85 bhp. Two came to Le Mans- one for Stewart and Derby test driver Louis Bonne, and the other for ex-boxing champion Louis Villeneuve, and motor-racing artist Georges Hamel.

The other Bugatti in the field was an unusual hybrid – Auguste Bodoignet had taken the supercharged 1.5-litre Bugatti engine out of his Type 37 and instead fitted a 1351 cc straight-four supercharged Ruby K engine. His co-driver was Fernand Vallon, here for his tenth Le Mans.
Another one-off special was entered by Edward Russell, Lord de Clifford. A two-seat prototype of the new Lagonda Rapier, it was fitted with a short-crankshaft 1080cc and an over-sized 82-litre fuel tank.

up to 1-litre entries 
Clément-Auguste Martin, and his Équipe de l’Ours team, had bought up the race-cars from Amilcar when they retired from motor-racing. This year, in conjunction with client-drivers, he entered four cars in various configurations. A number of changes were made before the race, but in the end there was one entry in the 1-litre class and the other three had 1.1-litre side-valve engines. The most interesting variant was that of Jean de Gavardie, along with the straight-6 1092cc engine without its supercharger (which meant needing 13 fewer laps to be run), was fitted with a streamlined aluminium "tank" bodyshell. Gavardie once again had veteran Arthur Duray as his co-driver, who had formerly raced with Aries four times in the 1920s.

As well as the two 1.5-litre Singers, there were a further four 972cc versions entered. The engine had been developed and could put out almost 40 bhp. Two works entries (for Stan Barnes’ brother Donald with journalist Tommy Wisdom, and Norman Black/Roddy Black)were supported by two other privateer efforts. MG also had small-engine entries in the 1-litre class. The Midget PA was the successor to the J2 model. The new 847cc engine put out 36 bhp and with it strengthened chassis the car could get up to 120 kp/h (75 mph). Two were entered (including one by female hillclimb racer Anne-Cécile Rose-Itier) as well as a J4 model.

This year, the works Tracta team prepared two cars, one taking the Biennial Cup entry. The Alin brothers also returned with their BNC 527 for the Cup. However, this time they reduced the size of the Ruby engine to run in the 1-litre class. Likewise, Charles Metchim brought back his Austin 7. In the interim, he had upgraded it to the Ulster sports version. With its improved twin-carburettor engine, it was now capable of 120 kp/h (75 mph).

Practice and Pre-Race
Étancelin put in the fastest lap in practice with a new lap record of 5:26. Comparative times include Brunet's Bugatti doing 5:45 and Lord Howe clocking a 5:55 in practice.

Race

Start
Raceday was fine and very hot. This year, the honorary starter was the president of the French Auto Club Vicomte de Rohan Chabot. First away was Tim Rose-Richards pursued by Raymond Sommer. Nearing the end of the first lap, "Bert" Bertelli spun his Aston Martin into the Arnage sandbank. The rest of the field scrambled past without hitting him. With gearbox problems, it took him half an hour to get going again. On lap three, Sommer took the lead, and started putting in laps almost ten seconds faster than the rest of the field. By the end of the first hour he had built up a lead of almost two minutes. Alfa Romeos filled the top four places with Sommer, Rose-Richards, Chinetti and Saunders-Davies ahead of Veyron and Brunet in their Bugattis. An excellent seventh was John Ford's little, supercharged MG Magnette ahead of the 1.5-litre competition.
However, at 5.30pm, the radio speakers announced that the leader's car had stopped, on fire out on the track. Sommer was the race's first retirement and had pulled up at Arnage with steam and smoke pouring from the engine. Soon after, Max Fourny's Bugatti ran out of petrol and when he finally got back to the pits was disqualified for receiving outside assistance. The high temperatures were melting some of the new tar-seal and marshals spread wood-chips onto the track to alleviate that. Aside from a few spins on the slippery surface there were no serious accidents. The first pits-tops were around the two-hour mark, after the mandatory 24 laps. A faster pit-change from the Chinetti-Étancelin team put them in front until Earl Howe reeled them in and retook the lead at 8.15pm, on lap 43. Meanwhile, Saunders-Davies had pitted his Alfa Romeo from third with engine issues. Resuming in 17th, he completed only a few more laps before retiring on his lap 40 with a broken valve. So as dusk fell, this left just two Alfas in the race (albeit running 1-2).

Night
Howe led into the night until electrical problems suddenly left him with no headlights at 10.30pm. Stopping on the Hunaudières Straight, he spent an hour making the repairs under advisement from one of his pit-crew. Getting back to the pits, he resumed in 11th place. Over the course of the next two hours, Howe drove hard to get back up to sixth place until at 1am he pitted with clutch problems that proved to be terminal. Despite now holding a sizeable lead, Chinetti and Étancelin had their own issues with a leaking fuel-tank. As the leaders the previous year had done, the mechanics used chewing gum to seal the tank. The big Labric/Veyron Bugatti was a distant second, until soon after midnight when Veyron pulled up on the Mulsanne Straight with a broken engine.
This all allowed the remarkable progress of the 1.1-litre MG to continue, with Ford and Baumer now up to second, ahead of the Brunet Bugatti Type 55. The Biennial Cup was being dominated by the small British cars, with the von der Becke/Peacock Riley leading the MG, with the Fothringham/Appleton Aston Martin in third, and fourth on the track. This all changed in a hectic hour: Appleton spun on gravel at the Tertre Rouge corner and stuck himself into the sandbank. He ran back to the pits for instructions and two hours later was back in action although potentially also with outside assistance (vehemently denied by Appleton). Then just before 2am, Félix Quinault spun his Tracta at Maison Blanche. John Ford braked heavily but just clipped the Tracta and ending in the roadside ditch. Following the MG, Charles Brunet was blinded by the headlights facing towards him and his Bugatti ended up parked beside the MG. Anne-Cécile Rose-Itier narrowly avoided the carnage. Quinault was able to limp back to the pits and get repaired, but Ford and Brunet were both out the race.

Despite another electrical failure, Howe had got back up to sixth by 1am when clutch problems struck the Alfa. The pit-crew did their best but the damage was terminal and the "Lord-Earl" was out, now leaving just the one Alfa Romeo running.  Although with a 100-km lead, their leaking fuel-tank gave the pursuing pack of small British cars hopes of an improbable victory. The Morris-Goodall Aston Martin was now second with the three Rileys of van der Becke (still leading the Biennial Cup), Sébilleau and Dixon next; the team having an excellent race.

The race settled back down through the rest of the night. After the halfway point, at 4am, two cars were disqualified after failing to complete their minimum halfway distance. Gordon Hendy’s privateer Singer had been delayed by fuel-feed issues and the gearbox of the Bertelli Aston Martin had finally packed up and taken too long to repair.

Morning
As dawn broke, the Alfa Romeo had a lead of over an hour. Morris-Goodall spent seven minutes securing the steering column of his Aston Martin but was still secure in second. The three Rileys had reversed their positions, with Dixon now third, ahead of Sébilleau and van der Becke. The team had given team orders to the van der Becke car to ease off and preserve their engine, as they now had a commanding lead over its nearest competition for the Biennial Cup.
Soon after 10am, triple disappointment hit the Aston Martin team. Appleton had pitted with low oil-pressure then stopped out on the track. Then, after running second for almost eight hours, the engine of Morris-Goodall’s Aston Martin suffered a broken oil pipe stranding him out on the track. To cap it off, all on the same lap, the private Aston of Reggie Tongue crept into the pits with a shredded tyre.

Finish and post-race

But the demise of the Aston Martins were the final retirements, as the remainder of the field held on to reach the finish. Chinetti and Étancelin took the flag with a large margin of 13 laps  – the biggest of the decade, and second only to the Bentley win in 1927. In contrast, having been without direct competition for over half the race, the gentler pace of the winners as they eased off meant it was the shortest distance covered in the decade.
Having 23 finishers was the highest number since the very first race back in 1923. However, with virtually all the other big-engine cars retiring, the podiums were dominated by the smaller cars and in a fine result for British motoring, 16 of those cars were British cars.

The Riley works team took four of the next five places, led by Sébilleau/Delaroche, a lap ahead of Dixon/Paul. The 1.1-litre car of Peacock/van der Becke, coming home in fifth, repeated their victory in the Index of Performance from the year before, completing an outstanding 52 laps (37%) over target. This time, however, the margin was far narrower, finishing less than 3km ahead of team-mates Newsome/Maclure. But the consecutive results also meant they had a guaranteed win in the Biennial Cup.

Interrupting the Riley procession was the supercharged MG Magnette of Eccles/Martin. They had overtaken the unsupercharged Riley earlier in the afternoon as the latter concentrated on finishing for trophy victories. Seventh was the Lewis/Hindmarsh Singer. Delayed early on for 45 minutes with carburettor problems, they had driven very hard through the night and all Sunday back up the field, making up time. Although only 9km behind van der Becke, they had a tougher Index target with their 1.5-litre engine and finished second in the Biennial Cup. The quasi-works Singer of Frank Barnes was eighth and wrapped up a 1-2-3 for British cars in the Cup.

The Bugatti tourer of Mahé/Desvignes was the only other car over 2-litres to finish, aside from the winner, coming home in ninth. Not built for speed, it was easier on its engine and having got into the top-ten during the night, its reliability got it to the end. Among the female drivers, fortunes were mixed: Champney and Petre had an uneventful race and came home in 13th. Anne-Cécile Rose-Itier also had a trouble-free run, going to a prescribed pace and finishing 17th. Her MG beat its target distance by 30 laps. Gwenda Stewart only ran sixteen laps in the new Derby-Miller before the engine packed up. Later in the year though, she set a new speed record at Monthlèry in the car.

Étancelin was honoured with a civic reception in his home city of Rouen and he resolved to drive the winning Alfa Romeo to the event. The car was filled with petrol for the journey, but by the time he brought his bags down from the hotel, the gas had leaked out all over the forecourt, as the fuel tank had not been repaired since the finish. After a solid run in Le Mans, a fortnight later, Mahé and Desvignes took the Bugatti Type 44 to victory at Spa, this year run as a 10-hour touring car race.
The next year, Lord de Clifford gained notoriety as the last British peer tried in the House of Lords. He was an advocate for compulsory driver licences and speed limits, which came into British law in 1934. He was accused of speeding when involved in a fatal head-on car accident from a car travelling on the wrong side of the road. With the evidence provided he was acquitted. This was the last race for Tracta. Founder Jean-Albert Grégoire instead chose to market the innovative four-wheel drive technology and work with other manufacturers. Alongside Panhard and Alvis, the most significant collaboration was with Willys that used it with its Jeep.

Official results

Finishers 
Results taken from Quentin Spurring’s book, officially licensed by the ACO Class Winners are in Bold text.

Did Not Finish

Did Not Start

1934 Index of Performance

Note: A score of 1.00 means meeting the minimum distance for the car, and a higher score is exceeding the nominal target distance. Only the top-10 finishers are listed

Class Winners

Statistics
 Fastest Lap – P. Étancelin, #9 Alfa Romeo 8C-2300 MM-LM – 5:41.0secs; 
 Winning Distance – 
 Winner’s Average Speed –

References
Citations

Bibliography
 Clarke, R.M. - editor (1998)    Le Mans ‘The Bentley & Alfa Years 1923-1939’    Cobham, Surrey: Brooklands Books  
 Clausager, Anders (1982)    Le Mans London: Arthur Barker Ltd  
 Laban, Brian (2001)    Le Mans 24 Hours London: Virgin Books   
 Spurring, Quentin (2017)    Le Mans 1930-39 Sherbourne, Dorset: Evro Publishing

External links
 Racing Sports Cars – Le Mans 24 Hours 1934 entries, results, technical detail. Retrieved 28 May 2022
 Le Mans History – entries, results incl. photos, hourly positions. Retrieved 28 May 2022
 World Sports Racing Prototypes – results, reserve entries & chassis numbers. Retrieved 28 May 2022
 24h en Piste – results, chassis numbers, driver photos & hourly positions (in French). Retrieved 28 May 2022
 Radio Le Mans – Race article and review by Charles Dressing. Retrieved 28 May 2022
 Unique Cars & Parts – results & reserve entries. Retrieved 28 May 2022
 Formula 2 – Le Mans results & reserve entries. Retrieved 28 May 2022

24 Hours of Le Mans races 
Le Mans
1934 in French motorsport